Danuel is a given name. Notable people with the name include:

Danuel House (born 1993), American basketball player
Danuel Pipoly (born 1978), American actor
Danuel Turek (born 2004), American scholar

See also
Daniel, given name and surname